The Neoscopelidae (blackchins or neoscopelids) are a small family of deep-sea fish closely related to the lanternfish. They are found in tropical and subtropical marine waters worldwide.

They can be distinguished from the lanternfish only by a few technical characters, such as the position of the anal fin being far behind that of the dorsal fin. Some species also lack the light-emitting organs (photophores) of the lanternfish. One genus has photophores arranged in a single series along the edge of the tongue and one or two along the ventral surface of the body.

Neoscopelidae currently contains three genera, Neoscopelus, Scopelengys and the monotypic Solivomer (Philippines).

Species
The six known species of neoscopelids are grouped into three genera:
Neoscopelus
Scopelengys
Solivomer

References

Myctophiformes
Deep sea fish